Boleto bancário, simply referred to as boleto (English: bank ticket) is a payment method in Brazil regulated by  (FEBRABAN).

A boleto can be paid at ATMs, branch facilities and internet banking of any bank, post office, lottery agent and some supermarkets until its due date. After the due date it can only be paid at the issuer bank facilities.
Boleto can only be collected by an authorized collector agent in the Brazilian territory.

Open source projects like BoletoPHP allow the merchandisers to generate unregistered Boleto Bancários without communicating with the bank.

See also
Brazilian Central Bank
Pix (electronic payment system)

References

External links
 The Brazilian Federation of Banks

Banking in Brazil
Payment systems